Mira, Royal Detective is an American-Indian CGI-animated mystery children's television series produced by Wild Canary Animation, inspired by Indian culture and customs, and featuring the "first South Asian protagonist" in a Disney Junior show. It debuted on Disney Junior channel in United States on March 20, 2020, and in Canada on March 22. The second and final season premiered April 5, 2021 on Disney Junior and DisneyNOW.

Series overview

Episodes

Season 1 (2020-21)

Season 3: Mikku's Best Tum (2024)

Season 2 (2021-22)

Notes

References

Mira